Philip George Connolly  (14 November 1899 – 13 February 1970) was a New Zealand politician of the Labour Party.

Early life
Connoly was born in Dunedin on 14 November 1899 to Hugh Babbington Connolly and Evelyn Emily Connolly (née Smith). He was educated at McAndrew Road School and Otago Boys' High School until leaving school in 1914 upon the death of his father to work for a living as an apprentice fitter.  He also worked for New Zealand Railways Department at the Hillside Workshops. Upon the completion of his apprenticeship he gained employment at the Union Steam Ship Company as a marine engineer. He was later elected a member of the Institute of Marine and Power Engineers union and was chairman of the Hillside branch of the Amalgamated Society of Railway Servants and later its secretary.

Military career
In 1928 he was a foundation member of the Otago Division of the Royal New Zealand Naval Volunteer Reserve and was commissioned as an officer with the rank of Lieutenant. During World War II Connolly served in the Royal New Zealand Navy in both the Atlantic and Pacific, commanding the minesweeper ship HMS Deodar and antisubmarine vessel HMNZS Moa. He was decorated with the Distinguished Service Cross in 1941 for his service in safeguarding Channel convoys.

Political career

Connolly first developed an interest in politics upon the formation of the Labour Party in 1916. Connolly was a member of the South Dunedin branch of the Labour Party and was a member of the Otago Labour Representation Committee. In 1933 he was elected president of the South Dunedin branch and in 1934 his name was added to the approved list of Parliamentary Labour candidates. He was to become deeply involved in local body politics in Dunedin. He first ran for local office in 1933 unsuccessfully standing for the Dunedin City Council, Otago Harbour Board and Otago Hospital Board. He was likewise unsuccessful at the 1935 and 1938 local-body elections. He was eventually elected a member of the city council in a 1939 by-election. At the 1944 local-body elections he was also elected as a member of the Otago Harbour Board and Otago Hospital Board.

Connolly represented the Dunedin West electorate from 1943 to 1946, and then the Dunedin Central electorate from 1946 to 1963, when he retired. He narrowly missed selection for a cabinet portfolio in 1947 under Peter Fraser, though that year he was elected as the Labour Party's junior whip, being elevated to the senior whip in 1951.

Connolly ran as the Labour candidate for Mayor in 1953, but lost to incumbent Len Wright. Connolly received some respite as despite losing the mayoralty he was comfortably re-elected to the Otago Harbour Board and was appointed to the role of deputy-chairman. In 1953, he was awarded the Queen Elizabeth II Coronation Medal.

Connolly was an agitator against the leadership of Walter Nash during Labour's spell in opposition in the 1950s. He was one of the main instigators of the challenge to Nash in June 1954, which was unsuccessful. As a result, Connolly together with Bill Anderton and Arnold Nordmeyer were called before Labour's National Executive and given warnings about the threat of divisiveness to the party.

He was later appointed a Cabinet Minister by Walter Nash, and was Minister of Defence and from 12 December 1957 to 12 December 1960 in the Second Labour Government. He also was the Minister responsible for Police and War Pensions. He fulfilled an election pledge by government and abolished compulsory military training, despite strenuous opposition from the opposition National Party, the Returned Servicemen's Association and the Chief of the General Staff General Stephen Weir. For a short period in 1959 he was also acting Minister for Social Security where he announced increased welfare payments.

He returned to local-body politics after exiting Parliament. Initially Connolly was set to be Labour's mayoral candidate in Dunedin for the 1965 local-body elections, but was forced to withdraw on grounds of ill-health. Connolly was sure he would have won had he been able to stand, a feeling which was reinforced after his comparatively inexperienced replacement as Labour candidate, councillor Russell Calvert came very close to winning against the incumbent Stuart Sidey. In 1965 he was elected once again to the Otago Harbour Board where he "topped the poll", receiving more votes than any other candidate. In 1968 he was elected to the Dunedin City Council. He served on both bodies until his death.

Later life
In 1970, Connolly was offered a knighthood, though declined. He died suddenly at his Dunedin home on 13 February 1970, aged 70.

Notes

References

1899 births
1970 deaths
Members of the Cabinet of New Zealand
New Zealand defence ministers
Royal New Zealand Navy personnel of World War II
New Zealand Labour Party MPs
New Zealand MPs for Dunedin electorates
Members of the New Zealand House of Representatives
Recipients of the Distinguished Service Cross (United Kingdom)
Dunedin City Councillors
20th-century New Zealand politicians
Candidates in the 1941 New Zealand general election